Thrillville: Off the Rails is a theme park simulation video game developed by Frontier Developments and published by LucasArts. It is the sequel to the 2006 game Thrillville. The game was released worldwide in October 2007.

The Xbox 360 version of Thrillville: Off the Rails was made backwards compatible on Xbox One and Xbox Series X/S on November 15, 2021.

Plot
The player's Uncle Mortimer (Brian Greene) congratulates the player for making Thrillville one of the best theme parks in the world and for ridding Globo-Joy from the competition in the first game. However, he warns the player that Globo-Joy and Vernon Garrison might try to get revenge. It is later shown that each of the parks have been sabotaged by Globo-Joy and Garrison with Globo-Joy manipulating critics to give Thrillville Stunts bad reviews, overrunning Thrillville Otherworlds with their own robots that can get into attractions for free, hypnotizing guests into acting strangely in Thrillville Giant, and using disgruntled employees to sabotage in Thrillville Explorer. It also later becomes apparent that a Globo-Joy spy somehow worked into Thrillville's employment and is stealing the park's ideas for Globo-Joy. After some sleuthing, the player discovers that the spy is actually be Vernon Garrison Jr., the son of Globo-Joy's president who pretends to be a guest named Tim Twinklefingers. After defeating Garrison Jr. in a round of Robo KO, he is fired and removed from Thrillville and is sent home, though he vows revenge.

Gameplay
Like the original game, Thrillville: Off The Rails is a strategy and simulation game about being the park manager of all of the Thrillville theme parks. The game allows the placing and deletion of attractions and buildings such as flat rides, food and drink stalls, bathrooms, games, and also contains various minigames to play both in the park and in the game's "Party Play" mode, along with editing and allowing the players to ride their own roller coasters inside each of the Thrillville theme parks.

Reception

The game received "mixed or average reviews" on all platforms according to the review aggregation website Metacritic. Most critics cited that the mini-games are a welcome addition, especially for multiplayer; however, the game was criticized for its so-so graphics, including the PC and Xbox 360 versions. Critics also cited some cases of repetitiveness in gameplay.

References

External links
Frontier Developments plc. page
LucasArts page

2007 video games
Nintendo DS games
Wii games
Xbox 360 games
PlayStation 2 games
PlayStation Portable games
Windows games
Games for Windows certified games
Roller coaster games and simulations
Amusement park simulation games
LucasArts games
Frontier Developments games
Multiplayer and single-player video games
Video games developed in the United Kingdom
Xbox One games
Xbox Series X and Series S games